Harry Dunn (born 1953) is an English football manager and former player.

Harry Dunn may also refer to:
Harry "Cherries" Dunn (1892–1916), St. Louis gangster and member of the Egan's Rats
Harry Dunn (boxer) (fl. 1928), British Olympic boxer
Harry Dunn (1947–2017), drummer for The Hullaballoos
Harry Dunn (born c. 1954), footballer who made 901 appearances for Scarborough F.C. between 1965 and 1986
Harry Dunn (2001–2019), British man killed in a road traffic collision resulting in UK/US diplomatic controversy

See also
Henry Dunn (disambiguation)